Kyauk Kyauk Kyauk is a 2017 Burmese horror comedy film, directed by Aww Ratha starring Nay Toe, Khin Wint Wah, Htun Htun, Nan Myat Phyo Thin, Min Thway, Nang Khin Zay Yar, Kyaw Kyaw and Po Po (singer). The film, produced by 7th Sense Film Production premiered in Myanmar on August 4, 2017.

Cast
Nay Toe as Phoe Than Lone, Phoe Ar Luu
Khin Wint Wah as Thar Yar
Htun Htun as Min Nyo
Nan Myat Phyo Thin as Ta Mar
Min Thway as Khit Kaung
Nang Khin Zay Yar as Seint San
Kyaw Kyaw as Kyaw Kyar
Po Po (singer) as Mal Madi

See also
Kyauk Kyauk Kyauk 2

References

2017 films
2010s Burmese-language films
2017 comedy horror films
Burmese comedy horror films
Films shot in Myanmar